Leon Garror (May 2, 1948 – June 16, 2017) was an American football defensive back. He played for the Buffalo Bills from 1972 to 1973.

He died on June 16, 2017, in Mobile, Alabama at age 69.

References

1948 births
2017 deaths
Sportspeople from Mobile, Alabama
Players of American football from Alabama
American football defensive backs
Alcorn State Braves football players
Buffalo Bills players